Pey Zard-e Bahram Beygi-ye Olya (also Romanized as Pay Zard-e Bahrām Beygī-ye ‘Olyā) is a village in Pataveh Rural District, Pataveh District, Dana County, Kohgiluyeh and Boyer-Ahmad Province, Iran. At the 2006 census, its population was 190, in 38 families.

References 

Populated places in Dana County